Worlds in Collision is a 1950 book by Immanuel Velikovsky. 

Worlds in Collision may also refer to:

Worlds in Collision (album), an album and its title track by Pere Ubu
"Worlds in Collision", a song by God Is an Astronaut from the album Age of the Fifth Sun

See also
When Worlds Collide (disambiguation)